The Confessional is a 1995 mystery-drama film directed by Robert Lepage.

The film is set in Quebec City, in two distinct time periods. In the present day, Pierre Lamontagne (Lothaire Bluteau) searches for his estranged brother Marc (Patrick Goyette) to help unravel a family mystery. The mystery itself unfolds in flashbacks set against the backdrop of Alfred Hitchcock's 1952 filming of I Confess in the city.

The cast also includes Ron Burrage as Hitchcock, Kristin Scott Thomas as his assistant, and Jean-Louis Millette as Raymond Massicotte, Marc's lover who also holds the key to unlocking the Lamontagne family's secrets.

The Confessional won the Genie Award for Best Picture and the Claude Jutra Award for the best feature film by a first-time director at the 16th Genie Awards. The film was selected as the Canadian entry for the Best Foreign Language Film at the 68th Academy Awards, but was not accepted as a nominee.

Cast
 Lothaire Bluteau as Pierre Lamontagne
 Patrick Goyette as Marc Lamontagne
 Jean-Louis Millette as Raymond Massicotte
 Kristin Scott Thomas as Assistant to Hitchcock
 Ron Burrage as Alfred Hitchcock
 Richard Fréchette as André Lamontagne
 François Papineau as Paul-Émile Lamontagne
 Marie Gignac as Françoise Lamontagne
 Normand Daneau as The Young Priest Massicotte
 Anne-Marie Cadieux as Manon
 Suzanne Clément as Rachel
 Lynda Lepage-Beaulieu as Jeanne d'Arc
 Pascal Rollin as The Parish Priest Laliberte
 Billy Merasty as Moose
 Paul Hébert as The Parish Priest (1989)

See also
 List of films featuring diabetes
 List of submissions to the 68th Academy Awards for Best Foreign Language Film
 List of Canadian submissions for the Academy Award for Best Foreign Language Film

References

External links
 
 
 
 Canadian Film Encyclopedia

1995 films
French mystery drama films
Best Picture Genie and Canadian Screen Award winners
Canadian mystery drama films
1990s mystery drama films
Films about films
Films set in Quebec City
Films directed by Robert Lepage
Best First Feature Genie and Canadian Screen Award-winning films
Films shot in Quebec
Canadian LGBT-related films
LGBT-related drama films
1995 LGBT-related films
1995 directorial debut films
1995 drama films
Cultural depictions of Alfred Hitchcock
French-language Canadian films
1990s English-language films
1990s Canadian films
1990s French films